Small proline-rich protein 3 is a protein that in humans is encoded by the SPRR3 gene, which is found within the epidermal differentiation complex (EDC).

References

Further reading